John O'Neil may refer to:

John O'Neil (painter) (1915–2004), American painter and writer
John O'Neil (footballer) (born 1971), Scottish footballer
John O'Neil (rugby union) (1898–1950), American rugby union player
John O'Neil (rugby league), English rugby league footballer who played in the 1950s and 1960s
John O'Neil (baseball) (1920–2012), American baseball player
John G. A. O'Neil (1937–1992), American politician from New York
John O'Neil (priest), Irish Anglican priest
John E. O'Neil IV, U.S. Army officer
John Jordan O'Neil, better known as Buck O'Neil (1911–2006), American baseball player

Fictional characters
Mr. John O'Neil, a Teenage Mutant Ninja Turtles character

See also
John O'Neill (disambiguation)
John O'Neal (disambiguation)